Manki is a village in Watut Rural LLG of Morobe Province, Papua New Guinea. It is located at 7°10'0S 146°34'0E with an altitude of 889 metres (2919 feet).

References

Populated places in Morobe Province